Novate Milanese railway station is a railway station in Italy. Located in the Milan–Saronno railway, it serves the town of Novate Milanese. The ancient station of 1879 was demolished in 1992, when the actual building was opened.

Services 
The station is served by lines S1 and S3 of the Milan suburban railway network, operated by the Lombard railway company Trenord.

See also
 Milan suburban railway network

References

External links
 Ferrovienord official site - Novate Milanese railway station 

Railway stations in Lombardy
Ferrovienord stations
Milan S Lines stations